Ghostface may refer to:

 Ghostface (identity), a fictional identity used in the Scream film and television series
 Ghostface, a nickname used by the Marvel Comics character Gwenpool
 Ghostface Killah, American rapper 
 A manhwa by Hyung Min-woo

See also
 Ghostfacers (disambiguation)
 Ghost-faced bat